Dumi (also Duni) is a village in Achham District in the Seti Zone of western Nepal. At the time of the 1991 Nepal census, the village had a population of 1517 living in 332 houses. At the time of the 2001 Nepal census, the population was 1877, of which 35% was literate.

References

Populated places in Achham District
Village development committees in Achham District